Mebarria is a genus of fungi within the Melanconidaceae family. It was named after mycologist Margaret E. Barr.

References

Melanconidaceae